Paul Calixte Valentino (born 9 June 1902  in Pointe-à-Pitre, Guadeloupe; died 15 March 1988) was a politician from Guadeloupe who served in the French National Assembly from 1946 to 1955. He became socialist mayor of Pointe-à-Pitre in January 1951 after the unexplained death of the communist candidate Amédée Fengarol.

References 
 
 Page on the French National Assembly website

1902 births
1988 deaths
People from Pointe-à-Pitre
Guadeloupean politicians
French Section of the Workers' International politicians
Members of the Constituent Assembly of France (1945)
Members of the Constituent Assembly of France (1946)
Deputies of the 1st National Assembly of the French Fourth Republic
Deputies of the 2nd National Assembly of the French Fourth Republic
Deputies of the 3rd National Assembly of the French Fifth Republic